Quadring Eaudike is a hamlet in the South Holland district of Lincolnshire, England. Quadring Eaudike is within the civil parish of Quadring , a village 1 mile to the west.

The name Quadring, historically Quedhaveringe, is from the Old English meaning "muddy settlement of the family or followers of a man called Haefer".

Quadring Eaudike once contained a chapel, noted by Thomas Allen as not remaining in 1834. The previous chapel of ease was referred to in 1872 at which time a Primitive and a Free Methodist chapel existed.

In 1885 directory occupation listings included ten farmers, two blacksmiths, and the landlord of the New Inn public house. By 1933 there were seven farmers, one of whom was a cottage farmer and another a collector of Crown taxes, six smallholders, a fruit grower, and a beer seller.

References

External links

Hamlets in Lincolnshire
South Holland, Lincolnshire